CKSE-FM (106.1 MHz, Rock 106) is a mainstream rock formatted broadcast radio station licensed to Estevan, Saskatchewan, Canada, serving Estevan and Divide and Burke counties in North Dakota. CKSE is owned and operated by Golden West Broadcasting. As of the 2016/2017 hockey season, the station is also now the official carrier of Estevan Bruins hockey broadcasts.

History/Programming
The station received CRTC approval on January 25, 2011 and launched on September 12, 2012.

References

External links
Rock 106
 

KSE
KSE
Estevan
Radio stations established in 2012
2012 establishments in Saskatchewan